Mikhaylovka is a village in the Tüp District of Issyk-Kul Region of Kyrgyzstan with population of 3,699 in 2021. It is the center of Mikhaylovka rural community.

References 

Populated places in Issyk-Kul Region